France national rugby team may refer to national teams in the different varieties of rugby:

 France national rugby union team, often nicknamed les bleus, administered by Fédération Française de Rugby.
 France national rugby sevens team compete in the World Sevens Series
 France women's national rugby union team
 France A national rugby union team compete in various tournaments including the Churchill Cup
 France national rugby league team, often nicknamed les chanticleers, administered by Fédération Francaise de Rugby à XIII.